Priyanka Chopra is an Indian actress who primarily works in Hindi films. She made her debut with the 2002 Tamil film, Thamizhan. She made her Bollywood debut the following year with the spy thriller The Hero. The same year, Chopra's role in the box-office hit romantic musical Andaaz won her the Filmfare Award for Best Female Debut and her first Filmfare Award for Best Supporting Actress nomination. In 2004, she starred in the highly successful romantic comedy Mujhse Shaadi Karogi and garnered high critical acclaim for her breakthrough role in the romantic thriller Aitraaz which earned her the Filmfare Award for Best Performance in a Negative Role and a second Best Supporting Actress nomination. Chopra starred in six films in 2005, including Waqt and Bluffmaster!. In 2006, she starred in two of the highest-grossing films of the yearthe superhero flick Krrish and the action thriller Don.

In 2007 and 2008, Chopra starred in several critical and commercial failures including the ensemble romantic comedy-drama Salaam-e-Ishq, the sci-fi romance Love Story 2050 and the superhero fantasy Drona. However, in late 2008, her role in the highly acclaimed drama Fashion proved to be a turning point in her career. Her portrayal of a troubled model won her the National Film Award for Best Actress and the Filmfare Award for Best Actress. In 2009, Chopra starred in the caper thriller Kaminey, which is cited in the media as a cult classic of Indian cinema, and played twelve distinct characters in the romantic comedy What's Your Raashee?. She won the Filmfare Award for Best Actress (Critics) for her portrayal of a serial killer in the 2011 black comedy 7 Khoon Maaf.

Chopra subsequently starred in four of her most successful releasesthe action thriller Don 2 (2011), the action drama Agneepath (2012), the romantic comedy-drama Barfi! (2012) and the science fiction film Krrish 3 (2013), all of which were among the highest grossing productions of their respective years. Her portrayal of an autistic woman in Barfi! received widespread acclaim and won her several accolades. In 2014, she portrayed the eponymous boxer in the biographical sports drama Mary Kom for which she received several Best Actress awards and nominations. From 2015 to 2018, she starred as Alex Parrish on the ABC drama thriller series Quantico, becoming the first South Asian woman to headline an American network series. Also in 2015, Chopra starred alongside an ensemble cast in the comedy-drama Dil Dhadakne Do and won the Filmfare Award for Best Supporting Actress for portraying Kashibai in the epic historical romantic drama Bajirao Mastani, one of the highest grossing Indian films of all time. In 2016, Chopra produced the Marathi comedy-drama Ventilator, a critical and commercial success. Chopra has since starred in multiple Hollywood films such as Baywatch (2017), A Kid Like Jake (2018) and Isn't It Romantic? (2019). She later received high praise for playing a protective mother in the biographical drama The Sky Is Pink (2019), a film she also produced. In 2020, she appeared in the kids superhero film We Can Be Heroes, and followed it with supporting roles in the Academy Award-nominated satirical drama The White Tiger and The Matrix Resurrections (both 2021).

Film

As actress

As producer

Television

Theatre

Discography
As lead artist

As featured artist

Other appearances

Music videos

Video games

See also
 Awards and nominations received by Priyanka Chopra

Explanatory notes

References

External links

 
 
 Priyanka Chopra on Bollywood Hungama

Actress filmographies
Indian filmographies